Powerflo is the only studio album by American heavy metal band Powerflo. It was released on June 23, 2017 via New Damage Records. Recording sessions took place at NRG Studios and at Firewater Studios in Los Angeles. Production was handled by Josh Lynch and member Billy Graziadei, with Roy Lozano serving as executive producer. It peaked at number 17 on the US Billboard Heatseekers Albums chart.

Track listing

Personnel

Powerflo
Senen "Sen Dog" Reyes – lead vocals
Rogelio "Roy" Lozano – lead guitar, backing vocals, executive producer
Billy Graziadei – rhythm guitar, backing vocals, producer
Christian Olde Wolbers – bass, backing vocals
Fernando Schaefer – drums, percussion

Additional
Josh Lynch – producer
Jay Baumgardner – mixing
Maor Appelbaum – mastering
Filip Horsch – artwork, logo, package layout
Deborah J. Klein – management

Charts

References

External links

Powerflo albums
2017 debut albums